Chill filtering is a method in whisky making for removing residue. This is done mostly for cosmetic reasons — to remove cloudiness — however by many whisky drinkers it is thought to impair the taste by removing the details which differentiate between the many distilleries.

Method
Chill filtering prevents the whisky from becoming hazy when in the bottle, when served, when chilled, or when water or ice is added, as well as precluding sedimentation from occurring in the bottles. It works by reducing the temperature sufficiently so that some fatty acids, proteins and esters (created during the distillation process) precipitate out and are caught on the filter.

Factors affecting the chill filtering process include the temperature, number of filters used, and speed at which the whisky is passed through the filters. The slower the process and the more filters used, the more of the distillates will be collected, but at increasing cost.

This process generally impacts the taste of the whisky, by for example, removing peat particles that contribute to the complexity, subtlety and smokiness of the flavour. Some distilleries pride themselves on not using this process. Non-chill-filtered whisky is often advertised as being more "natural", "authentic", or "old-fashioned". For example, the Aberlour Distillery's distinctively flavored A'bunadh whisky, Laphroaig's Quarter Cask bottles, Kilchoman' s Machir Bay, and all of Springbank distillery's whiskies are not chill-filtered and are advertised as such. There are also a number of specialist whisky suppliers, such as the Scotch Malt Whisky Society, that provide bottlings from a wide range of distilleries without chill filtering.

Chemistry
Unfiltered whiskies chilled below a certain temperature can force some fatty acid esters out of suspension. In Scotch whisky these are usually agglomerations of ethyl dodecanoate and ethyl hexadeconate. Chill filtering removes these as well as ethyl palmitoleate from the whisky, although complete removal of ethyl dodecanoate is not seen as desirable as it tends to contribute positively to the character of a spirit.

References

Filtration
Whisky